The 1971 Pau Grand Prix was a Formula Two motor race held on 25 April 1971 at the Pau circuit, in Pau, Pyrénées-Atlantiques, France. The Grand Prix was won by Reine Wisell, driving the Lotus 69C. Jean-Pierre Jabouille finished second and Jean-Pierre Jaussaud third.

Classification

Race

References

Pau Grand Prix
1971 in French motorsport